The 1975–76 2. Bundesliga season was the second season of the 2. Bundesliga, the second tier of the German football league system. It was played in two regional divisions, Nord and Süd.

Tennis Borussia Berlin, Borussia Dortmund and 1. FC Saarbrücken were promoted to the Bundesliga while 1. FC Mülheim, SpVgg Erkenschwick, DJK Gütersloh, Spandauer SV, 1. FSV Mainz 05, FC Schweinfurt 05, Eintracht Bad Kreuznach and SSV Reutlingen were relegated to the Oberligas and Amateurligas.

Nord
For the 1975–76 season saw Bayer Leverkusen, Spandauer SV, Westfalia Herne and Union Solingen promoted to the 2. Bundesliga from the Oberliga and Amateurligas while Wuppertaler SV and Tennis Borussia Berlin had been relegated to the 2. Bundesliga Nord from the Bundesliga.

League table

Results

Top scorers
The league's top scorers:

Süd
For the 1975–76 season saw Eintracht Kreuznach, FSV Frankfurt, Jahn Regensburg and SSV Reutlingen promoted to the 2. Bundesliga from the Amateurligas and VfB Stuttgart relegated to the 2. Bundesliga Süd from the Bundesliga.

League table

Results

Top scorers
The league's top scorers:

Promotion play-offs
The final place in the Bundesliga was contested between the two runners-up in the Nord and Süd divisions. Borussia Dortmund won on aggregate and were promoted to the Bundesliga.

References

External links
 2. Bundesliga 1975/1976 Nord at Weltfussball.de 
 2. Bundesliga 1975/1976 Süd at Weltfussball.de 
 1975–76 2. Bundesliga at kicker.de 

1975-76
2
German